"Solo" is a song by Polish singer and model Blanka, released on 23 September 2022. The song is set to represent Poland in the Eurovision Song Contest 2023 after winning , Poland's national final for that year's Eurovision Song Contest.

Background and composition 
According to Blanka, the song is about a relationship that is one-sided and a "sham", where one loses "their head for someone" yet the other person in the relationship is "playing [with them]." The song represents her belief that "sometimes it's worth being alone and that's OK...  we can get to know ourselves better and see that the other person may not be the best for us."

Eurovision Song Contest

("Here beats the heart of Europe! We choose the hit for Eurovision") was the national final organised by TVP that selected the Polish entry for the Eurovision Song Contest 2023. The show will be held on 26 February 2023, with 10 artists and their songs competing. The winner was determined by a 50/50 combination of votes from a five-member professional jury and a public vote. In the event of a tie, the tie would be decided in favour of the jury.

On 15 February 2023, "Solo" was announced as one of the ten songs competing in the contest. Heading into the final, the song wasn't considered a heavy favorite to win the contest, being beat out by what was considered the favorite according to a Eurovision fan-site poll, Jann's "Gladiator". In the final, the song would manage to score 22 points, earning 12 points from the juries and placing second in the public vote. As a result, the song is scheduled to represent Poland in the Eurovision Song Contest 2023.

At Eurovision 
According to Eurovision rules, all nations with the exceptions of the host country and the "Big Five" (France, Germany, Italy, Spain and the United Kingdom) are required to qualify from one of two semi-finals in order to compete for the final; the top ten countries from each semi-final progress to the final. The European Broadcasting Union (EBU) split up the competing countries into six different pots based on voting patterns from previous contests, with countries with favourable voting histories put into the same pot. On 31 January 2023, an allocation draw was held, which placed each country into one of the two semi-finals, and determined which half of the show they would perform in. Poland has been placed into the second semi-final, to be held on 11 May 2023, and has been scheduled to perform in the second half of the show.

Controversy 

The song's win in  sparked controversy in Poland due to alleged rigged votes and corruption within the jury panel for the national selection.

Track listing

Charts

Weekly charts

Year-end charts

References 

2022 songs
2022 singles
Eurovision songs of 2023
Eurovision songs of Poland